= The City That Works =

The term "The City That Works" may refer to:

- Chicago
- Stamford, Connecticut
- Toronto
